Mchuchuma in south western Tanzania near Ludewa off the northern tip of Lake Nyasa, is the site of major coal deposits.  There is also a thermal power station costing$612m.  Recent studies indicate that Mchuchuma/Ketewaka coal deposits should be connected to the coast by rail to facilitate exports. The railway that will be built will be part of the Mtwara Development Corridor project.

See also 

 Transport in Tanzania
 Timeline of African Union of Railways - other railway proposals.

References 

  

Geography of Tanzania